Marl-Hamm station is a railway station on the Gelsenkirchen-Buer Nord–Marl Lippe railway in Marl in the German state of North Rhine-Westphalia. It is classified by Deutsche Bahn as a category 6 station and was opened on 27 September 1968. It is located in the north of the city on an embankment. A section of the A 52 runs parallel to the line. It has a side platform and can be reached by stairs and lifts.

It is served by Rhine-Ruhr S-Bahn line S 9 at hourly intervals. Route: Haltern am See - Marl - Gladbeck - Bottrop - Essen -  Wuppertal.

It is also served by bus route 225 (Hüls – Marl + Waldsiedlung, at 30-minute intervals) operated by Vestische Straßenbahnen.

References 

S9 (Rhine-Ruhr S-Bahn)
Rhine-Ruhr S-Bahn stations
Railway stations in Germany opened in 1968
1968 establishments in West Germany
Buildings and structures in Recklinghausen (district)